Mitrofanovo is a rural locality (a village) in Malyshevskoye Rural Settlement, Selivanovsky District, Vladimir Oblast, Russia. The population was 18 as of 2010.

Geography 
Mitrofanovo is located 27 km southwest from Krasnaya Gorbatka (the district's administrative centre) by road. Malyshevo is the nearest rural locality.

References 

Rural localities in Selivanovsky District